Ecuador Highway 20 (E-20), known officially as "Transversal Norte" (North Transversal), is a highway in Ecuador which crosses the provinces of Esmeraldas, Santo Domingo de los Tsáchilas, Pichincha, Napo and Orellana.

References

020